Agnes Yahan Aggrey-Orleans, (née Bartels) is a Ghanaian diplomat.

Biography
Her father was Francis Lodowic Bartels, an educator and diplomat who became the first Ghanaian principal of Mfantsipim School. Agnes Aggrey-Orleans had her secondary education at the Wesley Girls High School in Cape Coast Ghana. She then attended the University of Ghana. She was married to the Ghanaian diplomat, James Aggrey-Orleans (1937–2018) who served as the Ghanaian High Commissioner to the United Kingdom from October 1997 to March 2001. Her diplomatic career included positions in various Ghana Missions, including those in New York and the Holy See. She invested as a Member of  Order of the Volta Award  in  2015 by the then President of Ghana John Dramani Mahama.

References

Ghanaian diplomats
Living people
University of Ghana alumni
Year of birth missing (living people)
Fante people
Recipients of the Order of the Volta